The Simplicia was a French automobile manufactured only in 1910.  A 10/12 hp light car, it had independent front suspension; the backbone chassis was in unit with its Aster engine and gearbox.

References
David Burgess Wise, The New Illustrated Encyclopedia of Automobiles.

Defunct motor vehicle manufacturers of France
Automobiles with backbone chassis